The Guangwu Great Wall is a section of the Great Wall of China located in Shanyin County, Shanxi.

History
The section of the wall was integral to the defensive system built around the Yanmen Pass because nomadic invaders would first attack the Guangwu section since it was to the north and west of the pass.

Geography
Nearby the Guangwu section are the present day inhabited villages of New Guangwu and Old Guangwu. New Guangwu was built during the Ming Dynasty on a site first occupied during the Warring States Period while Old Guangwu was built during the Song Dynasty and Liao Dynasty.

Features

The "Moon Gate" is a distinctive arched shaped door from the ruins of a watchtower.

References

Great Wall of China
Buildings and structures in Shanxi